Alexander Berelowitsch (born July 2, 1967, Kharkiv, Ukraine) is a FIDE trainer living in Germany. He was the International Master (IM) in 1993 and has been a Grandmaster (GM) since 1997. In 2001, he won the won the Ukrainian championship. He moved to the German Chess Federation in 2008.

Notable Tournaments

References 

Living people
1967 births
Ukrainian chess players
Chess grandmasters